Sanas Cormaic (or Sanas Chormaic, Irish for "Cormac's narrative"), also known as Cormac's Glossary, is an early Irish glossary containing etymologies and explanations of over 1,400 Irish words, many of which are difficult or outdated. The shortest and earliest version of the work is ascribed to Cormac mac Cuilennáin (d. 908), king-bishop of Munster. It is an encyclopedic dictionary containing simple synonymous explanations in Irish or Latin of Irish words. In some cases, he attempts to give the etymology of the words, and in others he concentrates on an encyclopedic entry. It is held to be the earliest linguistic dictionary in any of the non-classical languages of Europe. Many of its entries are still frequently cited in Irish and Celtic scholarship.

Manuscripts and editions (with external links)
The glossary survives, in part or whole, in at least six manuscripts. The work may have been included in the Saltair Chaisil ("Psalter of Cashel"), a now-lost manuscript compilation that is thought to have contained various genealogical and etiological lore relating to Munster. The versions of Sanas Cormaic divide into two groups: the earliest and shortest version represented by Leabhar Breac and the fragment in MS Laud 610, and a longer one represented by the Yellow Book of Lecan, which underwent some expansion in the hands of later redactors.

References

Further reading
Russell, Paul. "Sanas Chormaic." In Celtic Culture. An Encyclopedia, ed. J.T. Koch. p. 1559.
Russell, Paul. "Dúil Dromma Cetta and Cormac's Glossary." Études celtiques 32 (1996): pp. 115–42.
Russell, Paul. "The Sound of Silence: The Growth of Cormac's Glossary." Cambridge Medieval Celtic Studies 15 (1988): pp. 1–30.

External links
Mary Jones
Early Irish Glossaries

9th-century books
Irish texts
Early Irish literature
Irish dictionaries
Irish-language literature
Irish books
Medieval European encyclopedias
Irish encyclopedias